Brandon Ford is a former American football tight end. He was signed as an undrafted free agent by the New England Patriots in 2013. He played college football for Clemson from 2008 to 2012.

High school career
Ford graduated from Hanahan High School in South Carolina in 2008.

College career
Ford redshirted in 2009 before contributing in a limited capacity in 2009, catching one pass for four yards over the course of 28 offensive snaps. As a sophomore, Ford's role increased, as he caught ten passes for 78 yards over 123 snaps. As a junior, Ford started one game, collecting 14 receptions for 166 yards and two touchdowns over 222 snaps. He was named to the ACC Academic Honor Roll in each of his first three seasons. As a senior, Ford was a First-team All-ACC selection by both media and coaches after catching 40 passes for 480 yards and eight touchdowns, starting all thirteen games and playing 695 snaps.

Professional career

Clemson Pro Day

New England Patriots
On April 27, 2013, he was signed as an undrafted free agent by the New England Patriots. On August 12, 2013, he was waived by the Patriots. On the next day, he cleared waivers and was placed on the Patriots' injured reserve list. On August 17, 2013, he was released by the Patriots.

Boston Brawlers
Ford signed with the Boston Brawlers of the Fall Experimental Football League (FXFL) in 2014.

References

External links
Clemson Tigers bio

1989 births
Living people
American football tight ends
Clemson Tigers football players
New England Patriots players
Boston Brawlers players